Loreto de Franchis or Loreto di Franco (1578–1638) was a Catholic prelate who served as Bishop of Minori (1636–1638)
and Bishop of Capri (1634–1636).

Biography
Loreto de Franchis was born in Castel di Sangro, Italy in 1578 and ordained a priest in 1604.
On 22 March 1634, he was appointed during the papacy of Pope Urban VIII as Bishop of Capri.
On 26 March 1634, he was consecrated bishop by Francesco Maria Brancaccio, Bishop of Capaccio, Fausto Caffarelli, Archbishop of Santa Severina, with Giovanni Battista Altieri, Bishop Emeritus of Camerino, serving as co-consecrators. 
On 1 December 1636, he was appointed during the papacy of Pope Urban VIII as Bishop of Minori.
He served as Bishop of Minori until his death in 1638.

References

External links and additional sources
 (for Chronology of Bishops) 
 (for Chronology of Bishops) 
 (for Chronology of Bishops) 
 (for Chronology of Bishops) 

17th-century Italian Roman Catholic bishops
Bishops appointed by Pope Urban VIII
1578 births
1638 deaths
People from Castel di Sangro